Transiturus de hoc mundo is the papal bull issued on 11 August 1264 by Pope Urban IV in which the feast of Corpus Christi (festum corporis) was declared throughout the entire Latin Church. This was the first papally sanctioned universal feast in the history of the Latin Church.

Thomas Aquinas contributed substantially to the bull, mostly in parts concerned with the liturgical text of the new feast. Thomas composed the sequence Tantum ergo sacramentum for this purpose. The successors of Urban IV did not uphold the decree, and the feast was suspended until 1311, when it was reintroduced by Clement V at the Council of Vienne.

References

Documents of Pope Urban IV
1264